Shebster is a small remote hamlet, which lies 7 miles southwest of Thurso, in northern Caithness, Scottish Highlands and is in the Scottish council area of Highland.

Populated places in Caithness